"The Name of the Game Was Love" is a single by Canadian country music artist Hank Snow. It was written by Cy Coben. The song peaked at number 1 on the RPM Country Tracks chart. It also reached number 16 on the Billboard Hot Country Singles chart in the United States.

The song is a tongue-twister in the same vein as Snow's earlier hit I've Been Everywhere. In the lyrics, the narrator finds an old address book that listed all the girls he dated. He then begins reciting the names of all the girls.

Chart performance

References

1969 singles
Hank Snow songs
Songs written by Cy Coben
1969 songs
RCA Records singles